Kevin Lewis (born October 6, 1978 in Orlando, Florida) is a former professional American football linebacker in the National Football League who played for the New York Giants.

College football
He played college football at Duke. Lewis burst on the college scene against the #1 team in the country at the time, Florida State University, logging 8 tackles, a sack and an interception at the age of 17.

National Football League
Lewis originally signed with the Giants on April 24, 2000 as an undrafted free agent after the 2000 NFL Draft. After being inactive for the first games of 2000, Lewis was waived to make room for placekicker Jaret Holmes. He was re-signed when Ralph Brown was placed on injured reserve. Overall, he played in seven games without recording a stat. He was released as a final cut on September 3, 2001. The Giants re-signed Lewis to the practice squad a day later. On November 4, he was signed to the active roster. Despite spending the first half of the year on the practice squad, Lewis played in nine games, recording 12 tackles. 

After making the team out of training camp, Lewis recovered a fumbled snap against the Arizona Cardinals on September 30, 2002. Due to multiple injuries suffered by Giants players, Lewis got more playing time than was expected for him. Against the Washington Redskins on November 17, after Lewis tackled running back Ladell Betts he fumbled the ball, which was recovered by Giants player Marcellus Rivers. Lewis along with fellow linebacker, Nick Greisen got his first career start at linebacker against the Redskins on December 8. In the game, Lewis recorded six tackles and his first career sack. For the season, Lewis registered 12 tackles and a sack. 

Lewis followed up his 2002 performance by playing in all 16 games in 2003 and recording 16 tackles. When Mike Barrow was injured in the first game of the 2004 season, Lewis was named the starter over Nick Greisen. On October 31 against the Minnesota Vikings, he recovered a fumble by Mewelde Moore for 16 yards. At the end of the year, Lewis ended up leading the Giants with 91 tackles. He was released as a final cut on September 3, 2005. Lewis sat out every game in 2005 without being signed, but after Antonio Pierce and Chase Blackburn became injured, Lewis re-signed before the first playoff game against the Carolina Panthers.

Post-NFL

Key to the City of Orlando, 2005
Presented with the key to the city whereas January 20th is Kevin Lewis Day in Orlando, FL.  Lewis worked at the National Training Center in Clermont, Florida working with elite level high school football prospects. On February 13, 2013, he was hired as Orlando Jones High School's new head football coach.

References

1978 births
Living people
Players of American football from Orlando, Florida
Jones High School (Orlando, Florida) alumni
American football linebackers
Duke Blue Devils football players
New York Giants players